Kuehneromyces mutabilis (synonym: Pholiota mutabilis), commonly known as the sheathed woodtuft, is an edible mushroom that grows in clumps on tree stumps or other dead wood.  A few other species have been described in the genus  Kuehneromyces, but K. mutabilis is by far the most common and best known.

Description
The clustered shiny convex caps  are 6–8 cm in diameter.  They are very hygrophanous; in a damp state they are shiny and greasy  with a deep orange-brown colour towards the rim; often there is a disc of lighter (less sodden) flesh in the middle.  In a dry state they are cinnamon-coloured.
The gills are initially light and later cinnamon brown, and are sometimes somewhat decurrent (running down the stem).
The stipe is 8–10 cm long by about 0.5–1 cm in diameter with a ring which separates the bare, smooth light cinnamon upper part from the darker brown shaggily scaly lower part.  This type of stem is sometimes described as "booted".
This species always grows on wood, generally on stumps of broad-leaved trees (especially beech, birch and alder), and rarely on conifers.
It is found from April to late October, and also in the remaining winter months where conditions are mild.  It is often seen at times when there are few other fungi in evidence.

Range
Kuehneromyces mutabilis is found in Australia, Asia (in the Caucuses, Siberia, and Japan), North America, and Europe. In Europe, it can be found from Southern Europe to Iceland and Scandinavia.

Uses and caution

Though edible, K. mutabilis cannot be recommended as it could be confused with the deadly poisonous Galerina marginata, even by people who are quite knowledgeable. Although a typical K. mutabilis is easily distinguished from a typical G. marginata by the "booted" stipe which is shaggy below the ring (see photos), this character is not reliable and G. marginata can also have scales.  The main differences are:

While they are both hygrophanous, K. mutabilis dries from the centre outwards (so having  a lighter colour in the centre) and G. marginata dries from the edge inwards.
the stem below the ring is scaly below the ring in K. mutabilis, but normally fibrously silky in G. marginata.
K. mutabilis has a  pleasant mushroom smell and mild taste, whereas G. marginata tastes and smells mealy.

The caps of this mushroom can be fried or used for flavouring in sauces and soups (the stems being considered too tough to eat).

References

Sources
This article is partly translated from the German page.
Marcel Bon : The Mushrooms and Toadstools of Britain and North-Western Europe (Hodder & Stoughton, 1987).  
Régis Courtecuisse, Bernard Duhem : Guide des champignons de France et d'Europe (Delachaux & Niestlé, 1994-2000).

External links
Pholiota mutabilis, from Smith AH & Hesler LR. (1968). The North American Species of Pholiota. (Archived at Mykoweb.com.)
Pholiota mutabilis by Michael Kuo, MushroomExpert.Com, November, 2007.
Kuehneromyces mutabilis by Roger Philips, RogersMushrooms (website).
“Kuehneromyces mutabilis” by Robert Sasata, Healing-Mushrooms.net, February, 2008.

Edible fungi
Fungi described in 1871
Fungi of Europe
Fungi of North America
Strophariaceae
Taxa named by Jacob Christian Schäffer
Fungi of Iceland